Hugh Vernon Stiff (1916–1995) was a Canadian Anglican bishop in the 20th century.

Life and career
Stiff was born on 15 September 1916 and educated at the University of Toronto. He was a parishioner of the Church of St. Mary Magdalene in Toronto. He was ordained in 1953 and began his ordained ministry as missioner at Lintlaw, Saskatchewan. After this, he was Rector of All Saints' Saskatchewan, then Dean of Calgary.

In 1969, he became Bishop of Keewatin. In 1974, he became Dean of Toronto and Rector of St. James Cathedral, until his retirement in 1986. Stiff died on 24 September 1995.

References

1916 births
1995 deaths
20th-century Anglican Church of Canada bishops
University of Toronto alumni
Anglican bishops of Keewatin
Deans of Toronto